The Thälmann Mountains are a group of mountains in the Mühlig-Hofmann Mountains between Flogeken Glacier and Vestreskorve Glacier, in Queen Maud Land. They were mapped by the Norsk Polarinstitutt from surveys and air photos by the Norwegian Antarctic Expedition, 1956–60, and also mapped by the Soviet Antarctic Expedition in 1961 and named for Ernst Thälmann, a German communist leader in the 1920s.

References

Mountain ranges of Queen Maud Land
Princess Martha Coast